Jan Flachbart (born 3 March 1978) is a Czech football coach and a former player.

Career
Flachbart played for FC Zenit St. Petersburg in the Russian Premier League from 2004 to 2006.

References

External links

1978 births
People from Kolín
Living people
Czech footballers
Czech Republic youth international footballers
Czech Republic under-21 international footballers
Association football defenders
Bohemians 1905 players
AC Sparta Prague players
FK Jablonec players
FC Zenit Saint Petersburg players
SK Sigma Olomouc players
SK Sparta Krč players
SK Hlavice players
FK Bohemians Prague (Střížkov) players
FC Oberlausitz Neugersdorf players
Czech First League players
Czech National Football League players
Russian Premier League players
Oberliga (football) players
Czech expatriate footballers
Expatriate footballers in Russia
Czech expatriate sportspeople in Russia
Expatriate footballers in Germany
Czech expatriate sportspeople in Germany
Expatriate footballers in Austria
Czech expatriate sportspeople in Austria
Czech football managers